Idagaard is a manor house and estate located immediately south of Sleagelse, Denmark. The estate was created by the businessman Constantin Brun from land that had previously belonged to Antvorskov and is named after his daughter Ida Brun. It is now owned by the Idagaard Foundation.

History

Early owners, 17971810

Antvorskov Hovedgård was in 1799 acquired by Constantin Brun. He imported several families from Switzerland and established a production of Swiss cheese which was mainly exported to oversea markets. He also modernized the management with the introduction of chopping and threshing machines. Bruun was married to Friederike Brun, a leading salonist of her time. Idagaard was named after his daughter Ida Brun.

Bruun created four small estates from part of the land that had previously belonged to Antvorskov Hovedgård, naming them Idagaard Charlottendal, Augustendal and Karlsgaard after his children.

In 1806 all the estates were sold to Adam Wilhelm Hauch and Marcus Frederik Voigt. They immediately embarked on selling them to different buyers. Idagaard was acquired by Ole Rasmussen Schou. In the 1830s, it was acquired by L. Trolle. Yje next owners were William C. Mourier and then L.T. Schultz. In 1878, Schultz sold Idagaard to S. Spandet.

Hvid and the Idagaard Foundation
In 1818, Idagaard was acquired by Jens Hvidberg.He and his wife owned the estate for more than 30 years. In 1941, they established the Idagaard Foundation.

In 1963, Idagaard acquired 220 tønder of land from Charlottendal. Charlottendal jad been expropriated by the Danish state in conjunction with the establishment of Antvorskov Barracks. Charlottendal's former owner, D. F. de Neergaard, wjo also owned Valdemarskilde, acquired 100 tønder of forest from Idagaard as part of the arrangement. Much of the riginal Idagaard estate has later been sold off for urban redevelopemtn. Most of the land that remains is therefore the land that previously belonged to Charlottendal (and before that to Augustadal).

Architecture
The main building in from 1880. It is a single-storey, white-plastered building with a half-hipped roof clad in red tile.

Today
Idagaard is one of four estates owned by the Idagaard Foundation. The three others are Lerchenfeld in Vedbynørre (acquired in 2013), Saxbroholm (acquired in 2016) and Skelbækgården (acquired 2019). The land is managed by the owner of Svendsholm.

List of owners
 (1799-1806) Constantin Brun
 (1806- ) Adam Wilhelm Hauch
 (1806- ) Marcus Frederik Voigt
 ( -1835) Ole Rasmussen Schou
 (1835- ) L. Trolle
 ( - ) William C. Mourier
 ( -1878) L. T. Schultz
 (1878- ) S. Spandet
 ( -1918) E.V.J. Neergaard, gift Spandet
 (1918-1941) Jens Hvidberg
 (1941- ) Idagaard-Fonden

References 

Manor houses in Slagelse Municipality